Franciszek Trąbalski (October 10, 1870, Czempiń – July 26, 1964) was a Polish socialist politician and a longtime member of Polish Socialist Party (PPS).

Life

Franciszek Trąbalski, called Francis, was with Mary, born Mackowiak married. He is the father of Stanislaw Trabalski and the grandfather of Charles Trabalski. His grave is located in the cemetery of the parish of St. Joseph in Zabrze, the former Hindenburg of Upper Silesia. A particularly friendly relationship had Francis always to Richard Lipinski which he had met in Leipzig. This was established by the fact that their children, Lipinski's daughter Margaret and Trabalski`s son Stanislaw Trabalski, married in 1921.

Education
Francis attended the German School in Srem, where he passed the matriculation examination. After school he went to the higher trade school to study. In order to finance this, he worked in the commercial sector, and gave private lessons. At the same time he learned the "proper job" of Shoemaker.

Profession
End of 1888, he opened to defray the living expenses for his family, a shoemaker in Leipzig. The shoemakers' guild, which over the influx of Poles was not pleased forced the closure of his shop. Now he was working in the basement of his house in the Poniatowskistraße.
In addition to his political duties Trąbalski worked part-time in between 1894 and 1896 as a teacher of Polish small schools in Leipzig. After the birth of his son Stanislaw he took a job as a city official. In 1899 he published in the newspaper workers, supported by the SPD, Robotnicza Gazeta, first article.

Political career
 
 
Already in his early youth he was interested in politics. From a young age, he distributed leaflets which was called on to resist the Prussian Germanization, against the forcible introduction of the German language in Poland, now in the Prussian province. His efforts were supported among others by Rosa Luxemburg, Ludwik Warynski, Felix Dzerzhinsky  and Julian Balthasar Marchlewski. When he therefore threatened with arrest, the only 18 year old fled his native Czempin (then part of the Kingdom of Prussia and later German Empire and in 1920, Poland), political opinion, first to Berlin, later on Halle to Leipzig. Trąbalski made contact with German social democrats, with August Bebel, Johann Karl Pinkau, George Schoepflin, and particularly to Wilhelm Liebknecht, he had a friendly relationship. Francis was still in the same year (1898) in the Polish choir in Leipzig, behind which was hidden because of the still prevailing socialist law, an illegal socialist organization. As Francis until the abolition of the socialist law for the courier services in neighboring Borsdorf living Wilhelm Liebknecht took over, he also met his son, Karl Liebknecht. In this organization were, inter alia, Rosa Luxemburg in 1900, Hugo Haase and Lenin, who, when he was staying in Leipzig, attended Trabalski. Immediately after the fall of the socialist law, Franz took effect on 1 October 1890 the SPD again legally operating at. With the beginning of 1891 he was also a member of the recently founded in Berlin in Germany of Polish Socialist Party (TSP). In 1901 he was persuaded by the comrades to Katowice in Upper Silesia, to move to the corner of the Three Emperors (Germany, Austria-Hungary and Russia). There should be contact points set up so that the working party could be activated for the PPS. Another such point of contact, he set up in Kaliningrad, has been placed in refugee money, passports and other available. This meeting was called Koenigsberg process known in the Karl Liebknecht appeared as a defender Trabalskis. Trabalski worked there as a party secretary.

Political offices
In 1893 he became leader of the Polish socialists in Leipzig. In the same year he joined the PPS. From 1906 to 1909 he was secretary of the party executive in the Prussian part of Poland. 1922 to 1939 served as the leader of all Trąbalski Polish Socialists in Germany. In addition, (1922-1937) he was chief editor of "Głosu Ludu" (Voice of the People) and "Związkowiec" (Union). After the Second World War he was a leader of the PPS (Polish Socialist Party) in Silesia, and from 1945 to 1948 he was a member of the party leadership. From 1947 to 1952 he was a member of the Sejm and served as a senior marshal at the beginning (as the oldest MP). During his long-standing commitment to public service, he was head of the Polish socialist movement in Germany, Member of Parliament, Senior Marshal, and in his capacity as Sejm Marshal pro tempore due to seniority, he served for one day on 4 February 1947 as acting head of the Polish state, as temporary president of the National Council of State (Head of State at that time). After the PPS and the PPR 1948 (by the Soviet-backed Communist Party) were united, he became a member of the new Polish United Workers' Party.

Had a particularly friendly relationship with Richard Lipinski. This was reinforced by the fact that her kids, Lipinski's daughter Margaret and Trabalski's son, Stanislaw Trabalski, married in 1921.

Since Franz until the abolition of the socialist law courier services for the resident in neighboring Borsdorf Wilhelm Liebknecht took over, he also met his son, Karl Liebknecht.

Immediately after the fall of the socialist law Trąbalski took effect on 1 October 1890 the SPD again legally operating at. With the beginning of 1891 he was also a member of the recently founded in Berlin in federal Polish Socialist Party (TSP).

Honors 
In the Polish city of Zabrze is a street named after him: Prezydenta Franciszka Trąbalskiego.

Publications 
Parallel to his journalism, has developed his literary activity. Social policy issues were initially in the foreground. Trąbalski was the author of numerous political and socio-political writings, such as:
 Half a century of socialism in Polish Silesia, 1947

Literature
- Mike Schmeitzner/Michael Rudloff: Geschichte der Sozialdemokratie im Sächsischen Landtag. In: Beiträge zur Geschichte der Arbeiterbewegung, trafo verlag, Berlin 40. Jahrgang 1998, ISSN 0942-3060

- Michael Rudloff: Eine Biographie zwischen den Systemen; In: Solche Schädlinge gibt es auch in Leipzig, Frankfurt am Main [u.a.], 1997; . S. 13–27.

- Leksykon historii Polski z 1995

- Universal Encyclopaedia PWN (tom 4) z 1976

- Zbigniew Gołasz, Franciszek Trąbalski i jego broszura "Barbarzyński mord w Katyniu", w: "Kroniki Miasta Zabrza" nr 2/2010

- Zbigniew Gołasz, Zapomniany prezydent, "Nasze Zabrze Samorządowe" nr 10/2007

- Zbigniew Gołasz, Franciszek Trąbalski, Strażnik prawdy o Katyniu, "Nasze Zabrze Samorządowe" nr 4/2010

- Zbigniew Kantyka, Franciszek Trąbalski, (1870-1964) Dzialacz ruchu socjalistycznego, Katowice 1985

External links
 Newspaper: Gazeta.pl Katowice – Page of Polisch with picture from Franz Trabalski

References

1870 births
1964 deaths
People from Kościan County
People from the Province of Posen
Polish Socialist Party politicians
Polish United Workers' Party members
Presidents of Poland
Marshals of the Sejm
Members of the State National Council
Members of the Polish Sejm 1947–1952
Silesian Uprisings participants